Samurçay (also, Samurçay) is a village in the municipality of Nabran in the Khachmaz Rayon of Azerbaijan.

References

Populated places in Khachmaz District